Liturgusa maya is a species of praying mantis in the family Liturgusidae.

References

Further reading

External links
NCBI Taxonomy Browser, Liturgusa maya

Liturgusidae
Insects described in 1894